Emma de la Barra, known by the pseudonym César Duáyen, (1861-1947) was an Argentine writer, best known for her novels Stella (1905) and Mecha Iturbe (1906) which were praised for their portrayal of modern women. She is closely associated with the Costumbrismo movement. Stella became the first best-seller in the country, and in 1943 it was adapted into a film starring Zully Moreno as the character of Stella. Other notable works include El Manantial (1908), Eleonora (1933) and La dicha de Malena (1943).

See also
 Lists of writers

References

External links
Article at Escritorasargentinas 

1861 births
1947 deaths
Feminist writers
People from Rosario, Santa Fe
19th-century Argentine women writers
20th-century Argentine women writers
20th-century Argentine writers
Pseudonymous women writers
19th-century pseudonymous writers
20th-century pseudonymous writers